Umberto Colombo (1880–?) was an Italian track and field athlete who competed at the 1900 Summer Olympics in Paris, France.

Biography
Colombo competed in the 100 metres event but was eliminated in the first round (quarterfinals) when he placed third in his heat.  He was similarly eliminated in the first round (semifinals) of the Athletics at the 1900 Summer Olympics – Men's 400 metres after finishing fourth or fifth in his five-man heat.

Olympic results

Bibliography
 De Wael, Herman. Herman's Full Olympians: "Athletics 1900". Accessed 18 March 2006.

See also
 Italy at the 1900 Summer Olympics

References

External links
 

Athletes (track and field) at the 1900 Summer Olympics
Olympic athletes of Italy
Italian male sprinters
1880 births
Year of death missing
Sportspeople from Bergamo
Date of birth missing
Place of death missing